Newton Lake State Fish and Wildlife Area is an Illinois state park on  in Jasper County, Illinois, United States. The park's grasslands are home to the largest of the three remaining greater prairie chicken flocks in Illinois.

The park centers on Newton Lake, an artificial reservoir constructed to provide cooling water for the Newton Power Station, a coal-fired electricity-generating power plant operated by Ameren, a public utility holding company.

References

State parks of Illinois
Protected areas of Jasper County, Illinois
Reservoirs in Illinois
Protected areas established in 1979
Landforms of Jasper County, Illinois
1979 establishments in Illinois